Ville Hämäläinen (born July 6, 1981 in Lappeenranta) is a Finnish retired professional ice hockey player. He played in Liiga for SaiPa, Tappara, KalPa, HPK, Jokerit and Jukurit. He also played in DEL2 in Germany for Dresdner Eislöwen and the Elite Ice Hockey League with the Braehead Clan. He was drafted 251st overall by the Calgary Flames in the 2001 NHL Entry Draft.

Career statistics

Regular season and playoffs

International

References

1981 births
Living people
Braehead Clan players
Calgary Flames draft picks
Dresdner Eislöwen players
Finnish ice hockey forwards
FoPS players
HPK players
Jokerit players
Mikkelin Jukurit players
KalPa players
Kiekko-Vantaa players
KooKoo players
SaiPa players
Tappara players
People from Lappeenranta
Sportspeople from South Karelia
Finnish expatriate ice hockey players in Germany
Finnish expatriate ice hockey players in Scotland